Obaro Ejimiwe (born 18 January 1983) is a British singer, songwriter and musician better known by his stage name Ghostpoet. His first album, Peanut Butter Blues & Melancholy Jam, was shortlisted for the 2011 Mercury Prize. His 2015 album Shedding Skin was also nominated for the Mercury Music Prize. Following release of his fourth album, Dark Days + Canapés, on 18 August 2017. His fifth album I Grow Tired But Dare Not Fall Asleep was released on 1 May 2020.

History
In June 2010, Ghostpoet self-released his first EP The Sound of Strangers and was later featured in The Guardians "New Band of the Day".

Ghostpoet's first single "Cash & Carry Me Home" was released on 24 January 2011, followed by the debut album on 7 February 2011, Peanut Butter Blues & Melancholy Jam. His single "Survive It" was launched in Rough Trade East Record store, on London's Brick Lane on 9 May 2011.

In 2011, he supported Metronomy and Jamie Woon on their tours and performed at Glastonbury, Sónar, Latitude, Secret Garden Party and Bestival among others.

Ghostpoet was among the nominees for the 2011 Mercury Prize. The winner, PJ Harvey, was announced on 6 September 2011.

Ghostpoet's second album, Some Say I So I Say Light, was released on 6 May 2013. The album was preceded by the single "MSI musmiD", made available as a free download from SoundCloud in late February. "Meltdown", with guest vocals by Woodpecker Wooliams, was released as a single in April 2013.

His third album, Shedding Skin, was released on 2 March 2015. The album featured guest appearances by Nadine Shah, Etta Bond, Mélanie De Biasio, Lucy Rose and Paul Smith. The album was shortlisted for the 2015 Mercury Prize.

Ghostpoet's track "Finished I Ain't" appeared in the soundtrack of Sleeping Dogs.

Ghostpoet was featured on Massive Attack's song "Come Near Me", the B-side to "The Spoils".

In 2016 Ghostpoet curated the West Balkans edition of the British Council's interactive music project Mix The City, travelling around the region to record samples with various local musicians, and creating his own mix for the region.

In April 2017 Ghostpoet released the single "Immigrant Boogie" released via Play It Again, Sam. The track was produced by Leo Abrahams and mixed by Leo and Kristofer Harris. The track is the first from the album Dark Days + Canapés.

Ghostpoet released his fourth studio record Dark Days + Canapés on August 18th, 2017.

His fifth album, I Grow Tired But Dare Not Fall Asleep was released on the 1st of May, 2020.

Genre
Since the beginning of his career, Ghostpoet has avoided identifying his music as belonging to a particular genre. In March 2018, during his European tour, many venues started listing Ghostpoet as "hip hop" or "trip hop". Ghostpoet promoted the events via Twitter, always including a declaration along the lines of "I am not Hip Hop".

On 7 March 2018, when challenged by a fan via Twitter with the question "WHAT are you?", Ghostpoet responded: "So Interesting. Why is it so important for me to be part of a predetermined genre with its parameters and rules? I'm just an artist who experiments with sounds and loves guitars. It's ok to be confused, not everything in life needs explanation, sometimes we just have to go with it".

In recent times Ghostpoet has grown more comfortable with his increasing connection to the alternative rock and electronica genres.

Discography

Albums

Singles

EPs

Remixes

Guest appearances

References

External links
 

English male singers
1983 births
Living people
PIAS Recordings artists
21st-century English singers
21st-century British male singers
Brownswood Recordings artists